The SS Hydrus was an American steel-hulled Great Lakes bulk freighter, constructed in 1903 and launched as the R.E. Schuck. She was following the SS James Carruthers heading south on Lake Huron while carrying a load of iron ore when she and the Carruthers were caught in the Great Lakes Storm of 1913.

The Hydrus foundered and sank with a crew of twenty-four aboard on or around 8 November 1913
while heading for the St. Clair River. During the storm, waves were said to be 35 feet high along with wind gusts of 90 miles per hour. Five of the crew were found frozen to death in a lifeboat that washed ashore in Canada. The James Carruthers was also lost in the storm as well as the SS Argus, which was the sister ship of the Hydrus. The wreck of the Hydrus was located in the summer of 2015 by a team of shipwreck hunters led by David Trotter. The wreck is in over 160 feet of water, and is heavily encrusted with zebra mussels. It is upright and intact, though the hull has been damaged and the bow is twisted at a 45-degree angle from the rest of the ship. The holds still contain iron ore, and the pilothouse is intact, complete with the ship's wheel and engine-room telegraph.

References

Great Lakes freighters
Shipwrecks of Lake Huron
Maritime incidents in 1913
1903 ships
Ships built in Lorain, Ohio
Ships lost with all hands
Ships powered by a triple expansion steam engine
Wreck diving sites